Lake Local Schools is a school district located in Stark County, Ohio, United States. The district serves most of Lake Township (including the village of Hartville) except for the southwestern quarter of the township, which is served by the North Canton City School District. The district also serves very small portions of Marlboro Township, and Suffield Township in Portage County.

The schools in this district include: Lake Primary School, serving grades Pre-K through 1, Lake Elementary School, serving grades 2 through 6, and Lake Middle/High School, serving grades 7 through 12. The superintendent of the Lake Local School District is Kevin Tobin.

Bond Issue 14
On Tuesday, May 5, 2015, the voters of Lake township passed Lake Local Schools Issue 14. The issue passed with voter counts of 2,922 votes yes and 2,509 votes no. Including 44 voters who abstained, overall turnout was 39.4% of the township electorate. The levy was proposed as a $34.6 million bond issue over 36 years. Included with the bond were two operating levies:a $1.5 million permanent levy and a $.5 million continuous levy. Homeowners would pay $221 in additional taxes if they owned a $100,000 home, which would result in approximately $2.5 million in new revenue for the school district.

Structural Deficiencies
Hartville Elementary was 93 years old in 2015 and structurally deficient to contemporary standards. Lake Elementary, attached to Hartville, would need to be replaced in conjunction. At the middle school building, issues included air quality, the dissolving conditions of the supporting west wall, and other logistical issues caused by the design of the then 36-year-old building. The repairs of such issues would cost approximately $14 million and a replacement of the school comparatively $21 million. Project architects believe that the levy is justified by state standards which suggest a school should be replaced when renovation costs are two thirds or greater of the replacement cost. The high school requires $15 million in renovations. These come after a 1999 construction project that largely focused on the high school and not the middle school. A replacement of the high school at the time of the bond issue was $39 million.

Proposed Building improvements
The district will restructure its schools and the grades they will contain. Lake Elementary and Hartville Elementary will be combined into a single school containing grades 2–6. Uniontown Elementary will house the districts k-2 school. The high school will now include 7th and 8th grades. Uniontown Elementary will be receiving a 9,700 square foot addition and 49,000 square feet of complete renovation of the current building. The additions at Uniontown include a new gymnasium, media center, and lunchroom. The new 2-6 building includes a 135,000 square foot addition and will receive a new mailing address. The 7-12 building will feature 64,000 square feet of renovations and 110,123 square feet of additions.

Funding Issues
Officials of the campaign to pass bond issue 14 promoted the issue believing $58 million of Ohio School Facilities Commission would be coming from a tobacco company lawsuit from 2007. The settlement in 2007 resulted in $4.1 billion for the commission. A spokesman for Ohio Facilities Construction Commission confirmed that these funds were exhausted in fiscal year 2011, four years prior to the passage of bond issue 14. The spokeswoman for Lake Local schools Karen Koch claimed after that the school wouldn't have promoted the tobacco lawsuit money if they had known it wasn't available. The funding for the project would come from state dollars, now backed by bonds sold by the Ohio general revenue fund and money allocated by legislators.“We had no idea whatsoever... Back in 2009 and 2011 when the schools tried to pass those bond issues, that (tobacco settlement) money was there, (We) were not aware that the money was not still available in 2015... We didn’t ask that question and they didn’t share it.”                                                                                                   -Karen Koch on funding for the bond issue

References

External links

School districts in Stark County, Ohio